The Salinas Challenger, previously known as Challenger ATP de Salinas Diario Expreso, is a professional tennis tournament played on outdoor hard courts. It has been part of the Association of Tennis Professionals (ATP) Challenger Tour. It was held annually in Salinas, Ecuador from 1996 to 2014. After a hiatus, it came back in 2021, and it was played on hard court instead of red clay.

David Nalbandian was the only one to have won both singles and doubles titles in the same year

Past finals

Singles

Doubles

References
ITF search

 
Challenger ATP de Salinas Diario Expreso
Challenger ATP de Salinas Diario Expreso
Challenger ATP de Salinas Diario Expreso
Challenger ATP de Salinas Diario Expreso